Ganger may refer to:
The head of a gang of labourers, especially on canals, or of platelayers on railways
Ganger (band), a Scottish alternative rock band
A manufactured biological creature in the BBC Doctor Who universe
Ganger, Karnal, a village in Haryana, India
Ganger Rolf ASA, a Norwegian holding company for the Olsen family

See also
Gengar, a Pokémon species